Chalisgaon Assembly constituency is one of the 286 Vidhan Sabha (Legislative Assembly) constituencies of Maharashtra state in western India. This constituency is located in the Jalgaon district.

Chalisgaon is part of the Jalgaon Lok Sabha constituency along with five other Vidhan Sabha segments of this district, namely Jalgaon City, Jalgaon Rural, Erandol, Amalner and Pachora.

Members of Legislative Assembly
1980: D.D.Chavan, Indian Congress (Socialist)
1985: Vasuderao Apuram Changare, Indian Congress (Socialist)
1990: Ishwar Jadhav, Bharatiya Janata Party
 1995: Sahebrao Ghode, Bharatiya Janata Party
 1999: Sahebrao Ghode, Bharatiya Janata Party
 2004: Sahebrao Ghode, Bharatiya Janata Party
 2009: Rajivdada Deshmukh, Nationalist Congress Party
 2014: Unmesh Bhaiyyasaheb Patil, Bharatiya Janata Party
 2019: Mangesh Chavan, Bharatiya Janata Party

See also
 Chalisgaon
 List of constituencies of Maharashtra Vidhan Sabha

References

Assembly constituencies of Maharashtra
Jalgaon district